Tenneck may refer to:

 Tenneck (Werfen), a village in the cadastral municipality of Sulzau in the municipality of Werfen, Salzburg, Austria
 Hoher Tenneck (2,455 m), a peak in the Hochkönig massif, above the Blühnbach valley near Tenneck, Salzburg, Austria
  Niederer Tenneck, an arête below the Hoher Tenneck